Zizou Bergs was the defending champion but lost in the quarterfinals to Quentin Halys.

Halys won the title after defeating Ričardas Berankis 4–6, 7–6(7–4), 6–4 in the final.

Seeds

Draw

Finals

Top half

Bottom half

References

External links
Main draw
Qualifying draw

Play In Challenger - 1